The Breda-Pittoni B.P.471 was an Italian twin-engine airliner/military transport produced by Breda.

Design and development
As part of its efforts to get back into aircraft manufacturing following the war, Breda commissioned Mario Pittoni to develop a twin-engine medium transport designated the Breda-Pittoni B.P.471. The prototype first flew in 1950. It was an all-metal twin-engine monoplane of stressed-skin construction. It had a retractable tricycle undercarriage and wings were of an inverted-gull configuration, this allowed the main landing gear to be short and light. The cabin had room for 18-passengers or freight. The company proposed many uses for the aircraft including a civil airliner and freighter, military navigation trainer or utility freighter. With no interest from buyers the prototype was operated by the Italian Air Ministry as a staff transport.

Operators

Italian Air Force

Specifications (B.P.471)

References

External links

 BP.471
The Breda wind tunnel by Mario Pittoni Technical Memorandum for Naca 1939 - from NASA Technical Reports Server

BP.471
1950s Italian airliners
1950s Italian military transport aircraft
Aircraft first flown in 1950
Mid-wing aircraft
Twin piston-engined tractor aircraft